Phillipa Gray  (born 16 February 1989 in Thames, New Zealand) is a New Zealand paralympic cyclist.

Gray, who is sight and hearing impaired from Usher syndrome, won a gold, silver and bronze medal, with pilot Laura Thompson in the cycling at the 2012 Summer Paralympics.

In the 2013 New Year Honours, Gray was appointed a Member of the New Zealand Order of Merit for services to cycling.

References

External links 
 
 

1989 births
Living people
New Zealand female cyclists
Paralympic cyclists of New Zealand
Paralympic gold medalists for New Zealand
Paralympic silver medalists for New Zealand
Paralympic bronze medalists for New Zealand
Paralympic medalists in cycling
Cyclists at the 2012 Summer Paralympics
Medalists at the 2012 Summer Paralympics
Sportspeople from Thames, New Zealand
Members of the New Zealand Order of Merit
21st-century New Zealand women